Sila (also called Sida) is a Loloish language spoken by 2,000 people in Laos and Vietnam (Bradley 1997). Sila speakers are an officially recognized group in Vietnam, where they are known as the Si La.

Phonology

Consonants 

Unaspirated plosives are usually realised as voiced stops. Phonetically, /l̥/ is realized as [͡l̥l]. The palatal nasal is noted as /ɲ/ although the phonetic realisation is closer to [ȵ], with the blade of the tongue remaining at a short distance from the palate.

Example contrasts 
/p/ vs. /pʰ/: /pa33la33/ ‘moon’ vs. /ɐ31pʰa31/ ‘leaf’

/t/ vs. /tʰ/: /ta31/ ‘to look at’ vs. /tʰa33/ ‘PROHIBITIVE’

/tɕ/ vs. /tɕʰ/: /tɕɐ31/ ‘to have, to exist’ vs. /tɕʰɐ31/ ‘to speak’

/k/ vs. /kʰ/: /ki55lɯ55/ ‘green’ vs. /a31kʰi55/ ‘foot’

/f/ vs. /s/: /fɔ31/ ‘to protect vs. /sɔ31/ ‘to study’

/x/ vs. /ɣ/: /xɯ55/ ‘gold’ vs. /ɣɯ55/ ‘good’

/m/ vs. /n/: /ma̰31/ ‘person’ vs. /na̰31/ ‘deep’

/ɲ/ vs. /ŋ/: /ɲa55/ ‘frost’ vs. /ŋa55/ ‘salty’

/w/ vs. /j/: /wa33/ ‘careless’ vs. /ja31/ ‘child’

/l/ vs. /l̥/: /lɐ33wa33/ ‘palm of hand’ vs. /l̥a33/ ‘to fall down’

Vowels 

All vowels can be creaky vowels, which are contrastive.

Sila diphthongs are /ɤi/, /ai/, /ao/, /oa/.

Example contrasts 
/i/ vs. /e/ vs. /ɛ/: /pi33/ ‘to win’ vs. /pe33/ ‘to divide up’ vs. /pɛ33jo31/ ‘dragon’

/y/ vs. /ø/: /tʰy31/ ‘to spit out/ vs. /tʰø31/ ‘to wrap up’

/ɯ/ vs. /ɤ/: /tɯ31/ ‘to hit’ vs. /tɤ31/ ‘to soak’

/u/ vs. /o/ vs. /ɔ/: /tʰu55/ ‘thick’ vs. /tʰo55/ ‘to open a hole’ vs. /tʰɔ55/ ‘number of times/

/a/ vs. /ɐ/: /tɕa31/ ‘to eat’ vs. /tɕɐ31/ ‘to have, to exist/

Tones 
Sila has three lexical tonemes and two grammatical tonemes.

Phonotactics 
All consonants can occur as onsets, with /m/ able to form a syllabic nasal.

/j/ and /l/ may occur as medials, but /j/ only after bilabial and velar stops and /m/, and /l/ only after bilabial stops and /m/.

Unvoiced stops and nasals can occur as codas, but these are only found in words recently borrowed from Lao

Distribution
According to Edmondson (2002), the Sila number about 700 people in Vietnam and live in the following 3 villages.

Seo Hay, Can Hồ Commune, Lai Châu Province, Vietnam
Xì Theo Chai, Can Hồ Commune, Lai Châu Province, Vietnam
Nậm Sín, Mường Nhé Commune, Điện Biên Province, Vietnam

According to the elderly Sila, seven Sila families had emigrated from Mường U and Mường Lá of Phongsaly Province, Laos, 175 years ago. They initially arrived at a location called Mường Tùng, and relocated several times before arriving at their present locations.

In Laos, Sila is spoken in:
Naahok Village, Nyot U District, Phongsaly Province
Ban Ban Sida, Muang Namtha, Luang Namtha Province
Chaohoi village, Nyot U District; Phongsai village, Bun Neua District (Kingsada 1999)
Longthang village, Nyot U District; Sida village, Luang Namtha District, Luang Namtha province (Shintani 2001)
Namsing village, Nyot U District (Kato 2008)

References

Sources 
Edmondson, Jerold A. 2002. "The Central and Southern Loloish Languages of Vietnam". Proceedings of the Twenty-Eighth Annual Meeting of the Berkeley Linguistics Society: Special Session on Tibeto-Burman and Southeast Asian Linguistics (2002), pp. 1–13.
Ma Ngọc Dung. 2000. Văn hóa Si La. Hà Nội: Nhà xuất ban văn hóa dân tôc.

Southern Loloish languages
Languages of Laos
Languages of Vietnam